Book of Love is a 2022 British romance film starring Sam Claflin and Verónica Echegui. Directed by Analeine Cal y Mayor, the movie was filmed in England and Mexico.

Plot
Henry Copper (Sam Claflin) is a rather traditional, uptight English author of romance stories, that focus on love, but are restrained in terms of passion. Unfortunately his one published book is not selling, and he is somewhat lost as what to do. However, his publisher Jen (Lucy Punch) contacts him to tell him that his book is now in fact selling... in one country, Mexico, and that he needs to go there to push the book on a three city book signing tour.

Quickly getting his things together he flies the next day to be met by the translator of the book, Maria (Verónica Echegui) who takes him on a tour in her car with the Mexican publisher Pedro (Horacio Villalobos) and her son and grandfather. Henry attends the first book signing, which is incredibly popular, but Henry is confused about people's reactions, and because everyone is talking about sex. Despite her best efforts to mislead him, including mistranslating people's conversation to tone down the content, Henry finds out that Maria has not just translated the book; she has re-written it completely, transforming it into a passionate sexy romance novel, which is why it is so popular.

Henry is distressed, but has to continue with the book tour. As time goes by, he comes to grip with the fact the book is in fact better with her contribution, while she has to deal with the fact that his name is also contributing to the book's success. A romance grows between the two, though Antonio (Maria's ex played by Horacio Garcia Rojas) tries to interfere. The publisher contacts Henry and tells him that he has 10 weeks to complete a new book, and he needs to work with Maria.

The two work together, and eventually have a romantic night together. However, after some interference from Antonio, Henry becomes jealous and returns to the UK. Henry eventually realizes he loves Maria, and returns to a book signing event in Mexico. He has arranged for both their names to be on the cover, so that now she is billed as co-author. At the booksigning event, despite some unsuccessful interference from the passionate Antonio, Henry reveals his true feelings for her, and their relationship is re-kindled. The film finishes with Maria becoming an author in her own right, now writing her own novels, although they are still together.

Production
The film was shot entirely in Mexico, in Chiapas, San Cristóbal de las Casas, Casa Textil, a textile mill and marketplace in the city and at the Mayan ruins in Palenque. The producers include Michael Knowles for NOW Films and Naysun Alae-Carew for Buzzfeed. Duration is 1h 46m.

The film was created by David Quantick, who co-wrote it with director Analeine Cal Y Major.

Reception 
The film got average to good reviews, The LA Times said "Despite being often preposterous, the cross-cultural comedy “Book of Love” is an entertaining watch. Just don’t scratch even the slightest bit beneath its glossy, super-contrived surface" while stuff.co.nz said "a proper uncynical, cinematic rom-com for those aged between 25 and 65" while the Boston Herald said "It’s not “Bridget Jones’s Diary.” But it’s more exotic, and it’s better than that cloying piece of nonsense “Me Before You” (2016) that Claflin made with Emilia Clarke"

Cast
Henry Copper - Sam Claflin
Maria - Verónica Echegui
Jen - Lucy Punch
Antonio - Horacio Garcia Rojas
Pedro - Horacio Villalobos
Rosa - Laura de Ita
Host - Ruy Gaytan
Miguel - Giovani Florido
Bookshop owner -  Remmie Milner

References

External links 

2022 romance films